The Chinese Ambassador to Saint Lucia was the official representative of the People's Republic of China to Saint Lucia between 1997 and 2007.

In August 1997, St. Lucian prime minister Kenny Anthony announced that St. Lucia had established diplomatic relations with China. Bilateral relations between the countries were suspended after St. Lucia chose to recognize Taiwan, which St. Lucia had recognized from 1984, under the first premiership of John Compton.

List of representatives

References

Saint Lucia
China
Ambassadors